Dixie is a bus rapid transit station on the Mississauga Transitway in central Mississauga, Ontario, Canada. It is located on the west side of Dixie Road along the north side of Eastgate Parkway.

The first four stations on the Transitway at Central Parkway, Cawthra, Tomken and Dixie, opened on 17 November 2014.

Bus service

GO Transit
19 Mississauga/North York
40 Hamilton/ Richmond Hill Pearson Express

MiWay 
5 Dixie
73 Kamato
74 Explorer
100 Airport Express
107 Malton Express
109 Meadowvale Express
185 Dixie Express

Brampton Transit
185 Dixie Express

References

External links

Mississauga Transitway
GO Transit bus terminals
2014 establishments in Ontario